The Tiny Star is a 2019 children's picture book by Mem Fox and illustrated by Freya Blackwood. It is about a star falling to Earth, turning into a baby, living a loving fulfilling life, dying, than returning to the heavens as a star.

Development
According to Fox, it took her five years to write.

Publication history
 2021, US, Alfred A. Knopf 
 2019, Australia, Puffin Books

Reception
A reviewer for the Reading Time wrote "The Tiny Star is a valuable, uplifting and poignant story for the young to make sense of, and find comfort in, heartbreaking loss", and recommended it as a best book of the year. Publishers Weekly called it a "meditation".

The Tiny Star has also been reviewed by Kirkus Reviews, Books+Publishing, and StoryLinks.

Awards
 2020 Booksellers' Choice Children's book of the year shortlist
 2020 Australian Book Industry Awards Children's Picture Book of the Year shortlist
 2020 Speech Pathology Australia Book of the Year Awards Three to Five Years shortlist
 2020 Australian Indie Book Awards Children's shortlist

References

External links

 Library holdings of The Tiny Star
 Interview with Fox and Blackwood about the book

2019 children's books
Australian picture books
Books about death
Picture books by Mem Fox
Puffin Books books